Tazer Up! is an album by new wave band Wang Chung, released on 11 December 2012. It is the first full-length studio album released by the band since 1989's The Warmer Side of Cool.

Track listing

CD/Digital

References

Wang Chung (band) albums
2012 albums